The 2020 Michigan Wolverines softball team was an American college softball team that represented the University of Michigan during the 2020 NCAA Division I softball season. The Wolverines, led by head coach Carol Hutchins in her thirty-sixth season, played their home games at Alumni Field in Ann Arbor, Michigan. On March 12, 2020, the Big Ten Conference cancelled the remainder of all winter and spring sports seasons due to the COVID-19 pandemic.

Previous season
The Wolverines finished the 2019 season 45–13 overall, and 22–1 in the Big Ten, finishing in first place in their conference. Following the conclusion of the regular season, the Wolverines received an automatic bid to the 2019 NCAA Division I softball tournament after winning the 2019 Big Ten Conference softball tournament, and were defeated in the Regional Final by James Madison.

Roster

Schedule and results

Rankings

References

Michigan
Michigan Wolverines softball seasons
Michigan Wolverines softball